The 2010 ADAC Procar Series season was the sixteenth season of the ADAC Procar Series, the German championship for Super 2000 touring cars. The season consisted of eight separate race weekends with two races each, spread over six different tracks.

The series struggled for numbers in 2010 with the series failing to attract a dozen competitors to any of its events. BMW drivers Roland Hertner and Johannes Leidinger finished tied on points with Hertner claiming the title on countback.

Teams and drivers

Race calendar and results

Championship standings

References

External links
 Official ADAC Procar Series website

ADAC Procar Series
ADAC Procar Series seasons